Dorcas Sikobe Nixon (born 4 April 1989) is a Kenyan footballer who plays as a defender for Cypriot club Lakatamia FC and captains the Kenya women's national team.

Early life
Nixon hails from Kakamega.

International career
Nixon played for Kenya at the 2016 Africa Women Cup of Nations.

See also
List of Kenya women's international footballers

References

External links

1989 births
Living people
People from Butere
People from Kakamega
Kenyan women's footballers
Women's association football defenders
Kenya women's international footballers
Kenyan expatriate footballers
Kenyan expatriates in Cyprus
Expatriate women's footballers in Cyprus